Bizcocho Dominicano, or Dominican cake, is a type of cake popularized by bakeries out of the Dominican Republic of the island of Hispaniola. The cake is characterized by its moist and airy texture and meringue frosting. It is a popular fixture for special occasions, and is present at most events celebrated by Dominican families, including anniversaries, baby showers, communions, and birthdays. The cakes can be found at many Dominican American bakeries and are also a popular seller of many successful home businesses.

Ingredients and flavors
Like most cakes, primary ingredients include butter, flour, milk and eggs. A distinguishing factor of Dominican cake is its icing, or "suspiro." Suspiro is Italian meringue icing.

Gallery

References

Cakes
Dominican Republic cuisine